Province 8 (VIII), also called the Province of the Pacific, is one of nine ecclesiastical provinces making up the Episcopal Church in the United States of America. It is composed of sixteen dioceses in the nine states of Alaska, Arizona, California, Hawaii, Idaho, Nevada, Oregon, Utah, and Washington. Also part of the province are the Episcopal Diocese of Taiwan, which has been a diocese of the Church since 1960; and the Navajoland Area Mission which was established in 1979 to serve the specific spiritual and cultural needs of the Navajo Nation.

The province encompasses more than a third of the land mass of the United States, and nearly twenty percent of the country's population. Because of its sheer size, the province claims to contain the most demographically diverse population in the world. The Rt. Rev. James Mathes of the Diocese of San Diego serves as President and D. Rebecca Snow of the Diocese of Oregon serves as Vice President.

Dioceses of Province VIII

Diocese of Alaska
Diocese of Arizona
Diocese of California
Diocese of Eastern Oregon
Diocese of El Camino Real
Diocese of Hawaii
Diocese of Idaho
Diocese of Los Angeles
Diocese of Nevada
Diocese of Northern California
Diocese of Olympia
Diocese of Oregon
Diocese of San Diego
Diocese of San Joaquin
Diocese of Spokane
Diocese of Taiwan
Diocese of Utah

Other jurisdictions of Province VIII

Navajoland Area Mission
Episcopal Church in Micronesia

References and external links 
ECUSA Province Directory
Province VIII website

Ecclesiastical provinces of the Episcopal Church in the United States of America